Here's Where I Belong is a musical with a book by Alex Gordon and Terrence McNally, lyrics by Alfred Uhry, and music by Robert Waldman. The musical closed after one performance on Broadway.

Background
Based on John Steinbeck's novel East of Eden, the allegorical tale centers on the Trasks and the Hamiltons, two families drawn to the rich farmlands of Salinas, California, in the early 20th century. While Steinbeck traced the two clans through three generations, the musical limits the action to the period between 1915 and 1917 and focuses primarily on the Cain and Abel aspects of the work.

Production
McNally asked that his name be removed from the credits prior to opening night. The official opening on Broadway was postponed from February 20, 1968, to March 2, 1968, to allow time for rewrites to the book.

The musical premiered on Broadway at the Billy Rose Theatre on March 3, 1968, and closed after one performance and twenty previews. Directed by Michael Kahn and choreographed by Tony Mordente, the cast included Paul Rogers as Adam Trask, Walter McGinn as Caleb Trask, Ken Kercheval as Aron Trask, James Coco as Lee, Graciela Daniele as Faith, and Heather MacRae as Abra Bacon. The scenery was by Ming Cho Lee, costumes by Ruth Morley, and lighting by Jules Fisher.

The play was picketed by the newly formed Oriental Actors of America, a group of Asian American stage actors, as a protest against the practice of casting white actors in yellowface makeup to portray East Asian characters (usually Chinese or Japanese).  The role of "Lee", the Trask family's Chinese cook, had been assigned to white actor (and future Academy Award nominee) James Coco.  Variety would mention the picketing in its review of the failed musical and note, "On the basis of the show, they had a point." 

In his The New York Times review, Clive Barnes questioned whether the book (East of Eden) could be a viable musical as it was "too serious", but praised the sets by Ming Cho Lee and wrote that Paul Rogers had a "strong singing voice" and was dignified.

The play was profiled in the William Goldman book The Season: A Candid Look at Broadway.

Song list

Act I
 We Are What We Are
 Cal Gets By
 Raising Cain
 Soft Is the Sparrow
 Where Have I Been
 No Time
 Progress
 Good Boy
 Ballet
 Act Like a Lady
 The Send-Off
 Top of the Train
 Waking Up Sun

Act II
 Pulverize the Kaiser
 Where Have I Been (Reprise)
 Good Boy (Reprise)
 You're Momma's
 Here's Where I Belong
 We're a Home

Recordings
"We're A Home" was recorded by The Ray Conniff Singers in 1967 and released as a single (Columbia 4-44422). The recording was reissued in stereo on a Ray Conniff compilation CD "The Singles Collection, Vol. 1" (Collectables 7697) in 2005.
"Here is Where I Belong" was recorded by Al Caiola and released as a single in 1968 (United Artists 50252). It was also recorded by Ferrante & Teicher and released as a single in 1968 (United Artists 50259). Both were instrumental versions.

Notes

References

External links
Internet Broadway Database

1968 musicals
Broadway musicals
Musicals by Terrence McNally
Works by Alfred Uhry